Slovenia competed at the 2008 Summer Paralympics in Beijing. The country was represented by thirty athletes competing in seven sports. The delegation was Slovenia's largest in its history as an independent country.

Medalists

Sports

Athletics

Men's field

Women's

Cycling

Men's road

Men's track

Goalball

The men's goalball team didn't win any medals; they were 7th out of 12 teams.

Players
Gorazd Dolanc
Matej Ledinek
Dejan Pirc
Simon Podobnikar
Ivan Vinkler
Boštjan Vogrinčič

Tournament

Quarterfinals

5th-8th classification

7/8th classification

Shooting

Swimming

Table tennis

Slovenian competitors, including Mateja Pintar, took part in table tennis events who won the gold medal in her category in 2004 Summer Paralympics.

Men

Women

Volleyball

Women's tournament
The women's volleyball team didn't win any medals; they were defeated by the Netherlands in the bronze medal match.
Players
Marinka Cencelj
Danica Gošnak
Emilie Gradišek
Bogomira Jakin
Ana Justin
Saša Kotnik
Boža Kovačič
Suzana Ocepek
Alenka Šart
Štefka Tomič
Anita Urnaut

Group A matches

Semifinals

Bronze medal match

See also
2008 Summer Paralympics
Slovenia at the Paralympics
Slovenia at the 2008 Summer Olympics

External links
Beijing 2008 Paralympic Games Official Site
International Paralympic Committee

References

Nations at the 2008 Summer Paralympics
2008
Paralympics